Anna Alchuk (28 March 195521 March 2008) was a Russian poet and visual artist. An admirer summarized her work as "a free-spirited romp across complex and significant ideas about personhood, identity, representation, linguistic performance, and political action."

She was married for 33 years to the philosopher Michail Ryklin. At the time of her death the couple were living in Berlin where Ryklin was employed as a visiting professor at the university. The assessment that Alchuk's death had been a suicide was generally accepted, but did not go entirely unquestioned.

Anna Alchuk was the name under which she worked as an artist, and by which she is identified in many English language sources. However, fuller variants of her name are also used in some sources.

Life
Her parents were working on Sakhalin as geologists. Anna grew up in another rich mining region, in Vorkuta in the North Urals. She identified with her grandmother whom she never met, since the old lady spent the last thirty years of her life locked away in a psychiatric institution.

In 1973 she met Michail Ryklin whom she married in 1975. While Ryklin worked for his doctorate which focused on Claude Lévi-Strauss and Jean-Jacques Rousseau, between 1973 and 1978 Alchuk studied History at Lomonosov University (as Moscow's principal university was known at that time). During the build-up to the Dissolution of the Soviet Union, in 1987 and 1988 she was a co-publisher of the samizdat publications "Paradigma" ("Парадигма") and "MDP" ("МДП"). In 1983 Alchuk's mother, Maja Koljada, had been denounced and accused of "spreading untrue facts, contrary to better knowledge, which denigrate the Soviet state and social system". Koljada had been sent away to a labour camp hundreds of kilometers away from her family.

Towards the end of the 1980s she got together with a group of Moscow artists and conceptualist poets, to take part in the exhibitions of the new conceptual art movement. Her own first volume of poetry was published in 1994. During this period she was the organiser of numerous exhibitions and performances in which music and poetry were combined.

Anna Alchuk was a member of the Russian section of PEN International and of the Academy of Zaum. Her essays and articles featured in leading Russian journals, including . She was the editor-compiler of a collection of articles entitled "Женщина и визуальные знаки" ("Woman and visual signs") which appeared in 2000. During the final years of the twentieth century, hers became an increasingly international presence in the contemporary arts world, featuring in exhibitions not just in Russia, but also in Britain, Germany, Hungary and Sweden.

Life turned bitter early in 2003. In January an exhibition opened in Moscow under the challenging title . The focus of the exhibition was on the church. A few days after it opened, on 18 January, the exhibition was trashed by six people purporting to represent Christian Orthodox believers. The works of the 40 exhibitors were destroyed with paint. A statement appeared on the wall: "May you be damned". Two of the vandals, Lyukshin and Zyakin, were arrested at the scene and a  criminal trial took place. What appalled many in Russia and, as news of the trial spread, many international observers, was the fact that the authorities proceeded not against the vandals but against the exhibition organisers, Yuri Samodurov and Ludmila Vasilovskaya. A third person was on trial, one of the more high-profile exhibitors, Anna Alchuk Mikhalchuk. (On 23 August 2003 a Moscow court determined that Lyukshin and Zyakin had no case to answer.)

The lengthy trial and the events surrounding it hit Alchuk badly. Her husband was able to chronicle their experiences. Overnight their circle of friends halved in size. They were avoided. Alchuk found herself identified in the Russian press not as an adventurous artist and lyric poet but as a political figurehead of opposition. There was no protection offered from the constant anonymous threats, many of which were couched in nationalist and anti-semitic terms. The experience of social isolation and the growing belief that if the authorities said she was guilty of something then she must be, tore away at her self-image. It was the start of a long period of destabilisation. (The outcome of the trial was that Samodurov and Vasilovskaya were found guilty of inciting religious and ethic hostility under Article 282 of the Criminal Code. Each was fined one thousand rubles. Alchuk was found "not guilty" and acquitted.)

Constant threats by telephone and by letter continued: the threats were mostly of violence. Leaving the house became an ordeal. There were online death threats. The murder of Anna Politkovskaya shook her badly. Michail Ryklin later wrote, "Once acquitted by the court, she saw herself facing a community for whom the things for which she had fought and made sacrifices (initially it almost seemed and if this was about a common call for freedom of artistic expression) had completely lost their meaning. Over these years the art scene resigned itself to its defeat and even managed to profit considerably as a result. It was, it transpired, far easier to endure being a target of religious fanatics than having to put up with the repressive passivity of most of her fellow artists." Meanwhile, her daughter and grandchild in Moscow waited in vain for Alchuk to call.  Over the next few years Ryklin and Alchuk concluded that they no longer had a future in Moscow. In November 2007 they moved to Berlin: Michail Ryklin accepted a post as a visiting professor at the Humboldt University.

Death
On March 21, 2008 Anna Alchuk left the couple's Berlin apartment, telling her husband she was going to the shops to buy washing powder. It was a public holiday and the shops would be closed, but Ryklin, his nose in a book, did not register that till later. It was wet, cold and windy and she was dressed appropriately. Three hours later he noticed she had left her Mobile phone behind. Three weeks later, on 12 April, he was visited by two detectives. A body had been found in the Spree. He recognised the wedding ring when he was shown a photograph of it. Stones had been found in the coat pockets, together with a water-damaged picture of Manjushri. (The couple shared an interest in Buddhism.) Blood tests indicated a sleeping drug intake twenty times the doze conventionally prescribed for insomnia. The larynx was damaged. There was a puncture on the right side of the body with a broken needle in it. A hat had been drawn down firmly over the forehead and eyes.

The day after his wife disappeared Michail Ryklin shared some ideas with the investigating authorities in a letter. He urged them to take more seriously the possibility that there might be a political aspect to her disappearance: "Through her critical engagement with Russian society, and because of her Jewish provenance, Mrs Mikhalchuk was exposed to daily repression and threats of violence. Crimes of political violence against critics of the Russian government have increased massively in recent years. So you should not rule out a politically motivated or antisemitic crime in this case."

In 2014 Michail Ryklin published a book, described by one reviewer as "a record of grief and love", about his late wife. He had worked through police investigation reports of around 100 pages. He had worked through 27 numbered note books in which Anna, like most serious writers, had confided her thoughts and dreams, insights and, increasingly, her nightmares. He had discovered many things about Anna, about himself, and about their marriage, that he had not known before. One conclusion that he had quickly reached for himself was that, in an immediate sense, his wife's death had indeed been a suicide.

References

1955 births
2008 deaths
People from Sakhalin Oblast
Russian contemporary artists
Russian video artists
Russian women photographers
Russian writers
Russian women poets
Russian feminists
Russian expatriates in Germany
People of the Stasi
East German women
Hotel executives
German hoteliers
Moscow State University alumni